Fiammetta Baralla (2 May 1943 - 7 September 2013) was an Italian actress. She appeared in more than forty films from 1958 to 2006.

Selected filmography

References

External links 

1943 births
2013 deaths
Italian film actresses